Ovens, formerly also Athnowen, is a small village adjacent to the town of Ballincollig, County Cork, Ireland. The 2006 census recorded that the population of the village was 1,703 - an increase of 62.1% from the 2002 Census. Ovens is within the Cork North-West Dáil constituency.

Ovens is also a civil parish and the village is also the seat of a Roman Catholic parish of the same name.

History 
In Lewis' Topographical Dictionary of Ireland, published in 1837, Ovens is described under the Anglican parish name of Athnowen:

ATHNOWEN (ST. MARY), or OVENS, a parish partly in the barony of BARRETTS, but chiefly in that of EAST MUSKERRY, county of CORK, and province of MUNSTER, 1½ mile (W.) from Ballincollig; containing 1953 inhabitants. This parish, which is generally called Ovens, is situated on the south line of road from Cork to Macroom, and is bounded on the north by the river Lee, and intersected by the Bride.It comprises 4660 statute acres, as applotted under the tithe act, and valued at £7594 per annum: the soil in the northern or hilly part is rather poor and stony, but in the vales extremely rich, lying on a sub-stratum of limestone forming part of the great limestone district extending to Castlemore on the west, and to Blackrock on the east. The limestone is quarried to some extent for burning into lime for the supply of the hilly districts to the north and south for a distance of several miles.The principal seats are Grange, the residents of J. Hawkes Esq., which occupies the site of Grange abbey (said to have been founded by St. Cera, who died in 679), and includes part of the ancient walls; Sirmount of G. Hawkes, Esq., which occupies an elevated site commanding and extensive prospect over a highly interesting and richly cultivated tract of the country; Spring Mount, of S. McCarthy Esq.; Clashenure, of Kyrle Allen, Esq.; and the glebe-house of the Rev. W. Harvey. There are two boulting-mills on the River Bride; one at Killumney belonging to Mr. D. Donovan, jun.; and the other at Ovens, belonging to Messrs. R. Donovan and Sons. The petty sessions for the District are held every alternative week at Carroghally. The living is a rectory and vicarage, in the diocese of Cork, united by diocesan authority, in 1785, to the prebend of Kilnaglory in the cathedral church of St. Finbarr, Cork: the tithes amount to £425.The church is a neat ancient structure with a square tower crowned with pinnacles. There is a glebe-house, with a glebe of 20a. 2r. 17p. In the Roman Catholic divisions this parish is the head of a union or district called Ovens, which included also the parishes of Desertmore and Aglish, and the ploughlands of Millane and Killumney, in the parish of St. Finbarr, Cork: the chapel, erected in 1835 is a handsome edifice of hewn limestone, in the mixed Gothic and Grecian styles of architecture. The male and female parochial schools are supported principally at the expense of the rector. There is also a national school, in which are 140 children, under the patronage of the Roman Catholic clergy, for which a spacious school-room has been built near the chapel. A dispensary has been established for the relief of the sick poor.Near the bridge of Ovens over the river Bride is the entrance of the celebrated limestone caves, which Smith, in his history of Cork, describes as 18 feet in height; but from the accumulation of rubbish they are now not more than three feet high and are nearly filled with water. They branch off into several ramifications, and from the roofs of some of them depend stalactites of various forms: their dimensions have never been satisfactorily ascertained. There some remains of the ancient castle called Castle Inchy.''

Amenities 
Ovens remains a largely rural area, though urban Éire Óg is the local parish hurling and Gaelic football club. Agriculture remains the dominant local industry, though companies such as EMC Corporation and John A. Wood Ltd. provide employment to locals and those in the greater Cork area.

There is one primary school, Ovens National School, and the local Roman Catholic parish is the Ovens / Farran parish.

See also
List of towns and villages in Ireland
Patrick Cleburne (a Confederate general who was born in the Ovens area)

References

Towns and villages in County Cork